Deathray is a post-punk genre band from Sacramento, California..

Deathray may refer to:

 A death ray, a theoretical particle beam or electromagnetic weapon of the 1920s through the 1930s
 A raygun, a fictional energy weapon
 Archemedies' heat ray is commonly referred to as Archemedies' death ray
 The Death Ray (1925 film), a 1925 Soviet science fiction film
 The Death Ray, the British title for the 1932 American film Murder at Dawn, directed by Richard Thorpe
 The Death Ray (comics), a graphic novel by Daniel Clowes
 Death Ray (magazine), a British science fiction magazine